Fontes can refer to:

Places

France
 Fontès, a commune in the Hérault department

Portugal
 Fontes (Abrantes), a civil parish in the municipality of Abrantes
 Fontes (Santa Marta de Penaguião), a civil parish in the municipality of Santa Marta de Penaguião

People
 Azdrubal Fontes Bayardo (1922–2006), a Uruguayan racecar driver
 Fontes Pereira de Melo (1819–1887), Portuguese statesman, politician, and engineer
 Flavia Fontes, Brazilian filmmaker and film editor 
 José Fontes Rocha (1926–2011), Portuguese singer and instrumentalist
 Wayne Fontes, former head coach of the Detroit Lions NFL team

Literature
 Fontes Christiani, a bilingual collection of patristic and medieval Latin works with modern German translations